The BB 22200 is a class of electric locomotives in service with the French railways SNCF, built by Alstom between 1976 and 1986. They are a dual voltage version (1500 V DC and 25 kV 50 Hz AC) of the BB 7200 and BB 15000 classes.

History, operations and design
After the first test held in 1976, the BB 22200 were introduced on the Marseille–Nice–Ventimiglia line in southern France–northern Italy. The following year they started to haul longer distance trains such as the Train Bleu (1000 km from Ventimiglia to Paris) and the car-transport train between Marseille and Paris.

From 1994 nine of the class were used for hauling freight trains through the Channel Tunnel as the Class 92 locomotives were not yet delivered. These were numbered 22379/380/399-405, and were used until 1995. For use on British railways these locomotives were allocated the UK TOPS Class 22.

The surviving members of the class are used on services between Bercy–Nevers and Marseille–Bordeaux, as well as on TER services between Lyon, Chambéry and Modane.

Names
60 members of the class received names, chiefly of French communes, towns and cities.

See also
 SNCF BB 20011 and 20012 two locomotives of the class used as test locomotives for synchronous electric motors and other technology used in the SNCF Class BB 26000

Notes

References

Alstom locomotives
B-B locomotives
22200
1500 V DC locomotives
25 kV AC locomotives
Railway locomotives introduced in 1976
Standard gauge electric locomotives of France

Passenger locomotives